Luan Bueno Ferreira de Brito (born 26 June 1987), simply known as Luan, is a Brazilian footballer who plays for Santa Cruz, on loan from XV de Piracicaba as a defender.

Career statistics

References

External links

1987 births
Living people
Brazilian footballers
Association football defenders
Campeonato Brasileiro Série B players
Campeonato Brasileiro Série C players
Campeonato Brasileiro Série D players
Brasília Futebol Clube players
Associação Botafogo Futebol Clube players
Anápolis Futebol Clube players
Clube Atlético Bragantino players
Brasiliense Futebol Clube players
Associação Atlética Ponte Preta players
Associação Ferroviária de Esportes players
Boa Esporte Clube players
Joinville Esporte Clube players
Associação Desportiva Confiança players
Footballers from Brasília